The Prime Minister of Iraq is the head of government of Iraq. On 27 October 2022, Mohammed Shia' Al Sudani became the incumbent prime minister.

History 
The prime minister was originally an appointed office, subsidiary to the head of state, and the nominal leader of the Iraqi parliament. Under the 2005 constitution the prime minister is the country's active executive authority. Nouri al-Maliki (formerly Jawad al-Maliki) was selected to be prime minister on 21 April 2006. On 14 August 2014, al-Maliki agreed to step down as prime minister of Iraq to allow Haider al-Abadi to take his place. On 25 October 2018, Adil Abdul-Mahdi was sworn into office five months after the 2018 elections until his resignation in 2019. He was once again appointed, this time as a caretaker prime minister due to political dispute. Abdul-Mahdi was replaced by Mustafa Al-Kadhimi, who was approved by the parliament on 7 May 2020. Al-Kadhimi was replaced by Al-Sudani after the 2021 Iraqi parliamentary election.

Appointment 
After an election, the Council of Representatives elects the president of the Republic and his deputies, including the president of the Council of Ministers. The Presidency Council must then name a prime minister unanimously within two weeks. If it fails to do so, then the responsibility of naming the prime minister reverts to the National Assembly. In that event, the Council of Representatives must confirm the nomination by an absolute majority. If the prime minister is unable to nominate his Council of Ministers within one month, the Presidency Council must name another prime minister.

Agencies directly subordinate
The Iraqi Counter Terrorism Bureau reports to the prime minister directly. The Iraqi CTB oversees the Iraqi Counter Terrorism Command, a formation that includes all Iraqi Special Operations Forces. As of 30 June 2009, there had been legislation in progress for a year to make the Iraqi CTB a separate ministry.

Seat 

The prime minister's office is located in the Al Zaqura Building in Baghdad.

See also 
 List of prime ministers of Iraq
 List of kings of Iraq
 List of presidents of Iraq

References 

Government of Iraq
Prime Ministers of Iraq
1920 establishments in Iraq